The 2004 GP Ouest-France was the 68th edition of the GP Ouest-France cycle race and was held on 29 August 2004. The race started and finished in Plouay. The race was won by Didier Rous of the Brioches La Boulangère team.

General classification

References

2004
2004 in road cycling
2004 in French sport
August 2004 sports events in France